Micaela Schäfer (born 1 November 1983) is a German nude model, television personality, DJ and singer.

Career
She was Miss East Germany 2004, Miss Venus 2005, The Face of Campari 2005, and Miss Maxim 2006. She ranked eighth place in the first season of Germany's Next Topmodel in 2006.

Known for posing naked in various situations to attract publicity, Schäfer has released an autobiography entitled Lieber nackt als gar keine Masche ("better naked than no shtick at all").

Discography 
 "Life Is Just a Game 2010" – La Mica feat. Loona (2010)
 "U-Bahn ins Paradies" – Micaela Schäfer feat. Fränzi (2011)
 "So Much Love" – La Mica feat. Polina & Miami INC (2012)
 "U Made for Me" – Micaela Schäfer feat. Heidi Anne (2013)
 "Jump!" – Oliver DeVille feat. Micaela Schäfer (2013)
 "Michaela" (2014)
 "Blasmusik" – Finger & Kadel feat. Micaela Schäfer (2014)
 "Partypolizei" (2015)
 "Rock Me Tonight" – Micaela Schäfer & DJ Squizz feat. Vivienne Baur (2015)
 "Deine Freundin" – Jörg & Dragan (Die Autohändler) feat. Micaela Schäfer (2015)
 "Venus" (2015)
 "Let Me Wash Your Car" (2016)
 "Lauter" – Micaela Schäfer & Marco Rippegather (2017)
 "Germany Olé" – Micaela Schäfer, Yvonne Woelke, Andreas Ellermann (2018)
 "Can You English Please?" – Tobee feat. Micaela Schäfer (2018)

Awards 
 2012 Venus Award - Erotic Model of the Year
 2014 Venus Award - Erotic Model of the Year

References

External links 

 

1983 births
Living people
Actors from Leipzig
German people of Brazilian descent
German female models
German actresses
Top Model contestants
Models from Berlin
Actresses of Brazilian descent
Ich bin ein Star – Holt mich hier raus! participants